Filip Stanisavljević (born 20 May 1987) is a Serbian defensive midfielder player who plays for Voždovac.

Career 
After playing for Metalac, Javor, Újpest FC and Platanias, Stanisavljević signed for Radnik Surdulica in 2018.

On 1 July 2021, he signed with Voždovac.

Career statistics

Honours
Újpest
Hungarian Cup (1): 2013–14
Hungarian Super Cup (1): 2013–14

External links
 
 HLSZ

References

1987 births
Sportspeople from Požarevac
Living people
Serbian footballers
Association football midfielders
FK Metalac Gornji Milanovac players
FK Javor Ivanjica players
Újpest FC players
Platanias F.C. players
FK Radnik Surdulica players
FK Mladost Lučani players
FK Rad players
FK Voždovac players
Serbian SuperLiga players
Nemzeti Bajnokság I players
Super League Greece players
Serbian expatriate footballers
Expatriate footballers in Hungary
Expatriate footballers in Greece
Serbian expatriate sportspeople in Hungary
Serbian expatriate sportspeople in Greece